Fishermans Paradise is a small town located in the South Coast Region of New South Wales. It has 1 small park with a basketball court next to a small fire station.

References 

City of Shoalhaven
Towns in the South Coast (New South Wales)